The Oak Ridge Observatory (ORO, code: 801), also known as the George R. Agassiz Station, is located at 42 Pinnacle Road, Harvard, Massachusetts. It was operated by the Center for Astrophysics  Harvard & Smithsonian as a facility of the Smithsonian Astrophysical Observatory (SAO) from 1933 until August 19, 2005.

Description 

The observatory was established in 1933. Through its first 40 years, its primary research focus was on tracking minor planets and asteroids in the Solar System. Starting in the 1980s, astronomers began to use the facility to measure stars over long periods of time, which led to hunts for extrasolar planets, i.e., planets outside the Solar System. Surveys at Oak Ridge found many such distant planets.

The largest telescope east of Texas in the United States is the 61-inch reflector (see Hobby-Eberly Telescope). However, most of its projects were discontinued in 2005. Harvard University's Optical SETI program continues at the site.

It also housed an  steerable radio telescope once used in Project BETA, a search for extraterrestrial intelligence.  A 41-cm (16-inch) Boller and Chivens Cassegrain reflector originally housed at Oak Ridge is available for public use at the National Air and Space Museum's Public Observatory Project on the National Mall in Washington, DC.

The inner main-belt asteroid 4733 ORO, discovered at Oak Ridge in 1982, was named in honor of the observatory.

List of discovered minor planets 

In addition to the discoveries below, the Minor Planet Center inconsistently credits some asteroids such as 4760 Jia-xiang directly to the Harvard College Observatory although they have been discovered at Oak Ridge.

See also 
 Hobby–Eberly Telescope
 
 List of observatories
 Phoebe Waterman Haas Public Observatory
 Smithsonian Astrophysical Observatory

References

External links 

 Oak Ridge Observatory
 YouTube video
 Harvard Optical SETI
 Boston Globe: "Lights out", June 28, 2005
 Bok, B. J., Ewen, H. I., & Heeschen, D. S., "The George R. Agassiz radio telescope of Harvard Observatory", Astronomical Journal, Vol. 62, p. 8, 1957.

Astronomical observatories in Massachusetts
Buildings and structures in Worcester County, Massachusetts

Harvard University
Minor-planet discovering observatories